A ganglioside is a molecule composed of a glycosphingolipid (ceramide and oligosaccharide) with one or more sialic acids (e.g. N-acetylneuraminic acid, NANA) linked on the sugar chain. NeuNAc, an acetylated derivative of the carbohydrate sialic acid, makes the head groups of gangliosides anionic at pH 7, which distinguishes them from globosides. 

The name ganglioside was first applied by the German scientist Ernst Klenk in 1942 to lipids newly isolated from ganglion cells of the brain. More than 60 gangliosides are known,  which differ from each other mainly in the position and number of NANA residues. It is a component of the cell plasma membrane that modulates cell signal transduction events, and appears to concentrate in lipid rafts.

Recently, gangliosides have been found to be highly important molecules in immunology. Natural and semisynthetic gangliosides are considered possible therapeutics for neurodegenerative disorders.

Location
Gangliosides are present and concentrated on cell surfaces, with the two hydrocarbon chains of the ceramide moiety embedded in the plasma membrane and the oligosaccharides located on the extracellular surface, where they present points of recognition for extracellular molecules or surfaces of neighboring cells. They are found predominantly in the nervous system where they constitute 6% of all lipids.

Function
The oligosaccharide groups on gangliosides extend well beyond the surfaces of the cell membranes, and act as distinguishing surface markers that can serve as specific determinants in cellular recognition and cell-to-cell communication. These carbohydrate head groups also act as specific receptors for certain pituitary glycoprotein hormones and certain bacterial protein toxins such as cholera toxin.

The functions of gangliosides as specific determinants suggest its important role in the growth and differentiation of tissues as well as in carcinogenesis. It has been found that tumor formation can induce the synthesis of a new complement of ganglioside, and very low concentrations of a specific ganglioside can induce differentiation of cultured neuronal tumor cells.

Common gangliosides

 One NANA ("M")
 GM1
 GM2
 GM3
 Two NANAs ("D")
 GD1a
 GD1b
 GD2
 GD3
 Three NANAs ("T")
 GT1b
 GT3
 Four NANAs ("Q")
 GQ1

Structures of the common gangliosides
GM2-1  =  aNeu5Ac(2-3)bDGalp(1-?)bDGalNAc(1-?)bDGalNAc(1-?)bDGlcp(1-1)Cer
GM3  =  aNeu5Ac(2-3)bDGalp(1-4)bDGlcp(1-1)Cer
GM2,GM2a(?)  =  N-Acetyl-D-galactose-beta-1,4-[N-Acetylneuraminidate- alpha-2,3-]-Galactose-beta-1,4-glucose-alpha-ceramide
GM2b(?)  =  aNeu5Ac(2-8)aNeu5Ac(2-3)bDGalp(1-4)bDGlcp(1-1)Cer
GM1,GM1a  =  bDGalp(1-3)bDGalNAc[aNeu5Ac(2-3)]bDGalp(1-4)bDGlcp(1-1)Cer
asialo-GM1,GA1  =  bDGalp(1-3)bDGalpNAc(1-4)bDGalp(1-4)bDGlcp(1-1)Cer
asialo-GM2,GA2  =  bDGalpNAc(1-4)bDGalp(1-4)bDGlcp(1-1)Cer 		  
GM1b  =  aNeu5Ac(2-3)bDGalp(1-3)bDGalNAc(1-4)bDGalp(1-4)bDGlcp(1-1)Cer
GD3  =  aNeu5Ac(2-8)aNeu5Ac(2-3)bDGalp(1-4)bDGlcp(1-1)Cer
GD2  =  bDGalpNAc(1-4)[aNeu5Ac(2-8)aNeu5Ac(2-3)]bDGalp(1-4)bDGlcp(1-1)Cer
GD1a  =  aNeu5Ac(2-3)bDGalp(1-3)bDGalNAc(1-4)[aNeu5Ac(2-3)]bDGalp(1-4)bDGlcp(1-1)Cer
GD1alpha  =  aNeu5Ac(2-3)bDGalp(1-3)bDGalNAc(1-4)[aNeu5Ac(2-6)]bDGalp(1-4)bDGlcp(1-1)Cer
GD1b  =  bDGalp(1-3)bDGalNAc(1-4)[aNeu5Ac(2-8)aNeu5Ac(2-3)]bDGalp(1-4)bDGlcp(1-1)Cer
GT1a  =  aNeu5Ac(2-8)aNeu5Ac(2-3)bDGalp(1-3)bDGalNAc(1-4)[aNeu5Ac(2-3)]bDGalp(1-4)bDGlcp(1-1)Cer
GT1,GT1b  =  aNeu5Ac(2-3)bDGalp(1-3)bDGalNAc(1-4)[aNeu5Ac(2-8)aNeu5Ac(2-3)]bDGalp(1-4)bDGlcp(1-1)Cer
OAc-GT1b  =  aNeu5Ac(2-3)bDGalp(1-3)bDGalNAc(1-4)aXNeu5Ac9Ac(2-8)aNeu5Ac(2-3)]bDGalp(1-4)bDGlcp(1-1)Cer
GT1c  =  bDGalp(1-3)bDGalNAc(1-4)[aNeu5Ac(2-8)aNeu5Ac(2-8)aNeu5Ac(2-3)]bDGalp(1-4)bDGlcp(1-1)Cer
GT3  =  aNeu5Ac(2-8)aNeu5Ac(2-8)aNeu5Ac(2-3)bDGal(1-4)bDGlc(1-1)Cer
GQ1b  =  aNeu5Ac(2-8)aNeu5Ac(2-3)bDGalp(1-3)bDGalNAc(1-4)[aNeu5Ac(2-8)aNeu5Ac(2-3)]bDGalp(1-4)bDGlcp(1-1)Cer
GGal  =  aNeu5Ac(2-3)bDGalp(1-1)Cer

where
 aNeu5Ac = N-acetyl-alpha-neuraminic acid
 aNeu5Ac9Ac = N-acetyl-9-O-acetylneuraminic acid
 bDGalp = beta-D-galactopyranose
 bDGalpNAc = N-acetyl-beta-D-galactopyranose
 bDGlcp = beta-D-glucopyranose
 Cer = ceramide (general N-acylated sphingoid)

Pathology
Gangliosides are continuously synthesized and degraded in cells. They are degraded to ceramides by sequential removal of sugar units in the oligosaccharide group, catalyzed by a set of highly specific lysosomal enzymes. Mutations in genes coding for these enzymes leads to the accumulation of partially broken down gangliosides in lysosomes, which results in a group of diseases called gangliosidosis. For example, the fatal Tay–Sachs disease arises as a genetic defect which leads to no functional hexosaminidase A produced, causing GM2 to accumulate in lysosomes. Ultimately the ganglion cells in the nervous system swell enormously, disturbing the normal functions of neurons.

Gangliosides are also involved in several diseases:

Influenza, in which haemagglutinin of influenza virus exploits certain gangliosides to enter and infect the cells expressing them.
Guillain–Barré syndrome, which has been linked to the production of anti-ganglioside antibodies.
Cholera
Tetanus
Botulism
Leprosy
Obesity, where inadequate ganglioside expression in mediobasal hypothalamic neurons deregulates neuronal leptin and insulin signaling.

References

External links
 
 Overview of gangliosides at lipidlibrary.co.uk
  Overview of gangliosides at cyberlipid.org

Glycolipids